Caelostomus miser is a species of ground beetle in the subfamily Pterostichinae. It was described by Stefano Ludovico Straneo in 1942.

References

Caelostomus
Beetles described in 1942